Jan Magne Skanke (born 31 January 1977) is a Norwegian former professional footballer who played as a midfielder.

He played youth football for Byåsen IL. When Strindheim IL contested the 1995 Tippeligaen Skanke featured briefly, scoring one goal in two games. He then rejoined Byåsen where he played through the 1998 season.

References

1977 births
Living people
Footballers from Trondheim
Association football midfielders
Norwegian footballers
Byåsen Toppfotball players
Strindheim IL players
Eliteserien players
Norwegian First Division players